Pentwynmawr Platform railway station served the suburb of Pentwynmawr, in the historical county of Glamorganshire, Wales, from 1926 to 1964 on the Newport, Abergavenny and Hereford Railway.

History 
The station was opened on 8 February 1926 by the Great Western Railway. It closed to passengers on 21 April 1952. It still remained open to workers and schoolchildren with season tickets but it became unstaffed. It closed to workers on 31 January 1961 and closed completely on 15 June 1964.

References 

Railway stations in Great Britain opened in 1926
Railway stations in Great Britain closed in 1952
1926 establishments in Wales
1964 disestablishments in Wales
Former Great Western Railway stations